These railroads were bought, leased, or in other ways had their track come under ownership or lease by the Louisville and Nashville Railroad.

In 1902, the Atlantic Coast Line Railroad gained a majority of stock in the L&N, but it continued to operate as a separate company until its merger in 1982 into the Seaboard System Railroad.

The Georgia Railroad and the West Point Route were partly owned by the L&N.

Alabama and Florida Railroad

Alabama and Florida Railroad of Florida
Alabama, Florida and Georgia RailRoad
Florida, Alabama and Georgia RailRoad

Alabama Mineral Railroad
Anniston and Atlantic Railroad
Anniston and Cincinnati Railroad

Altamont and Manchester Railroad

Athens and Tellico Railway

Atlanta, Knoxville and Northern Railway
Marietta and North Georgia Railroad
Knoxville Southern Railroad

Bardstown and Louisville Railroad

Bay Minette and Fort Morgan Railroad

Birmingham Mineral Railroad

Birmingham and Tuscaloosa Railroad

Birmingham, Selma and New Orleans Railway

Black Mountain Railroad

Central Railroad

Central Transfer Railroad and Storage Company

Clarksville and Princeton Railroad

Clarksville Mineral Railroad

Louisville, Cincinnati and Lexington Railway
Louisville, Cincinnati and Lexington
Lexington and Frankfort Railroad 1869
Lexington and Ohio Railroad 1849
Louisville and Frankfort Railroad 1869

Louisville, Harrods Creek and Westport Railroad

Louisville, Henderson and St. Louis Railway
Louisville, St. Louis and Texas Railway

Louisville and Nashville Terminal Company

Mammoth Cave Railroad
Mammoth Cave Railroad

Mobile and Montgomery Railway
Alabama and Florida Railroad

Monon Railroad
Chicago, Indianapolis and Louisville Railway
Chicago and Dyer Railway 
Chicago and Indianapolis Terminal Company
Chicago and Wabash Valley Railroad 
Louisville, New Albany and Chicago Railroad
Bedford and Bloomfield Railroad
Bedford, Springville, Owensburg and Bloomfield Railroad 
Chicago and Indianapolis Air Line Railway
Orleans, West Baden and French Lick Springs Railway

Nashville, Chattanooga and St. Louis Railway
Nashville, Chattanooga and St. Louis Railway
Bon Air Railroad (Tennessee)
Duck River Valley Narrow Gauge Railroad (Tennessee)
Huntsville and Elora Railroad (Alabama)
Inman Branch (Tennessee)
McMinnville and Manchester Railroad (Tennessee)
Middle Tennessee and Alabama Railway
Nashville and Chattanooga Railroad
Nashville and North Western Railroad (Tennessee)
Hickman and Obion Railroad
Nashville and Tuscaloosa Railroad with Allen's Creek Extension (Tennessee)
Paducah, Tennessee and Alabama Railroad
Paducah and Tennessee Railroad of Kentucky
Paducah and Tennessee Railway of Tennessee
Tennessee Midland Railroad
Pikeville Branch (Tennessee)
Rome Railroad (Georgia)
Sequatchie Valley Railroad
Southwestern Railroad (Tennessee)
Tennessee and Coosa Railroad (Alabama)
Tennessee and Pacific Railroad (Tennessee)
Tracy City Branch (Tennessee)
West Nashville Branch (Tennessee)
Western and Atlantic Railroad (Georgia and Tennessee)
Winchester and Alabama Railroad (Alabama)

Paducah, Tennessee and Alabama Railroad

Pensacola Railroad

Pensacola and Atlantic Railroad

Pensacola and Louisville Railroad Company
Alabama and Florida Rail Road Company

Pensacola and Selma Railroad

References

External links
Seaboard System family tree (PDF) 

 
United States railway-related lists
Louisville, Kentucky-related lists